Metascience is the use of scientific methodology to study science itself.

Metascience may also refer to: 

Metascience (journal), a scientific review journal
Meta-analysis, statistical analysis of the results of multiple scientific studies

See also
List of metascience research centers
Science and technology studies
Science of science policy
Metaphysics
Metageography
Philosophy of science